The Arizona Complex League Padres are a Rookie-level affiliate of the San Diego Padres, competing in the Arizona Complex League of Minor League Baseball. The team plays its home games at Peoria Sports Complex in Peoria, Arizona, which is also the spring training home of the major-league Padres. The team is composed mainly of players who are in their first year of professional baseball either as draftees or non-drafted free agents.

History
The team first competed in the Arizona League (AZL) from 1988 to 2000. For the 1988–1992 seasons, the team played its home games at Scottsdale Stadium in Scottsdale. The team moved to Peoria and the Peoria Sports Complex in 1993.

After being absent from the league from 2001 through 2003, the team resumed operation in 2004 and has competed since then. In 2006, the team won the first-half title and went on to win the league championship by defeating the AZL Angels, 5–2. For the 2017–2019 seasons, the team fielded two squads in the league, differentiated by numerical suffixes (1 and 2). Prior to the 2021 season, the Arizona League was renamed as the Arizona Complex League (ACL).

Rosters

Notable players
Notable players for the team include:

 Dylan Axelrod
 Cody Decker
 Max Fried
 Mat Latos
 Derrek Lee
 Jake Peavy
 Fernando Tatis Jr.
 Will Venable

References

External links
 Official website (Padres 1)
 Official website (Padres 2)

Baseball teams established in 1988
Arizona Complex League teams
Professional baseball teams in Arizona
San Diego Padres minor league affiliates
Sports in Peoria, Arizona
Sports in Maricopa County, Arizona
1988 establishments in Arizona